The 2011 Barnsley Metropolitan Borough Council election took place on 5 May 2011 to elect members of Barnsley Metropolitan Borough Council in South Yorkshire, England. One third of the council was up for election and the Labour party stayed in overall control of the council.

After the election, the composition of the council was
Labour 43
Barnsley Independent Group 13
Conservative 6
Independent 1

Election result
The results saw Labour make 5 gains from the Barnsley Independent Group to have 43 councillors and a 23-vote majority. The Barnsley Independent Group dropped to 13 seats, while the Conservative party stayed on 6 seats and there remained 1 other independent. Labour defeated sitting councillors for the Barnsley Independent Group in Hoyland Milton, Kingstone, Old Town and Rockingham wards. They also gained Darfield where the sitting councillor had stood down at the election, with the successful Labour candidate being a former Member of the European Parliament Brian Key. The Labour leader of the council, Steve Houghton, called on his party not to be complacent after their gains, while the leader of the Barnsley Independent Group called the results "a bitter blow".

Among other results, Jane Collins for the United Kingdom Independence Party, following her second place in the 2011 Barnsley Central by-election, came third in Monk Bretton ward. Meanwhile, the British National Party, after putting up 19 candidates, failed to come close to taking any seats. Overall turnout in the election was 36.3%.

Councillors elected in 2007 ended their term in 2011. The change in vote shares in compared to this corresponding election.

Ward results

Changes in vote are calculated from the corresponding elections in 2007.

By-elections between 2011 and 2012

References

2011 English local elections
2011
2010s in South Yorkshire